Den andra skivan is the second studio album by the Swedish supergroup Glenmark Eriksson Strömstedt.

Track listing 

All songs written by Glenmark Eriksson Strömstedt.

Charts

References

External links 

 

2003 albums
Glenmark Eriksson Strömstedt albums
Columbia Records albums